Bailey Humphrey (born 11 September 2004) is an Australian rules footballer who plays in the Australian Football League (AFL). He was selected in the 2022 national draft by the Gold Coast Suns. Humphrey was considered a leading draft prospect of 2022. He plays as a mid-forward. Humphrey has been an outspoken supporter for mental health, having suffered depression and anxiety for years after a close friend committed suicide.

References 

Living people
2022 Australian Football League season
Australian Football League draft
Sportspeople from Melbourne
2004 births